The 41st Canadian Parliament includes a record number of female Members of Parliament, with 76 women elected to the House of Commons of Canada in the 2011 election. This represents a gain of seven seats over the previous record of 69 women in the 40th Canadian Parliament. By contrast, the 112th United States Congress had 72 women sitting in the 435-seat United States House of Representatives, and the 113th United States Congress has 81.

Of those 76 women, 38 were elected for the first time in the 2011 election.  This included former PSAC president Nycole Turmel, who was the first woman to hold the position.  She later accepted the role of interim leader of the NDP with the unanimous support of caucus, after Jack Layton took a temporary leave of absence to fight a second bout of cancer. Layton died on August 22, 2011, at which time Turmel formally assumed the title of Leader of the Opposition. She held the post until the election of Thomas Mulcair as leader of the NDP, and was the second woman to serve as Leader of the Opposition (the first was Deborah Grey).

The Green Party's Elizabeth May was the first woman leader of a political party to be elected to the House of Commons since former NDP leader Alexa McDonough. As they hold only two seats, the Greens are not recognized as having official party status in the House of Commons.

As well as a record number of women overall, the 41st Parliament will also contain a record number of younger women, with 18 women MPs who were under the age of 40 on election day, compared to just five in the previous Parliament.

The longest-serving women in the 41st Parliament are Hedy Fry and Diane Ablonczy, who were first elected in the 1993 election.

Three women who were elected in the 2011 election have since resigned their seats and four women have been elected in by-elections. As of November 17, 2014, there are 77 women currently serving in the House of Commons, and 258 women have served overall in the body's history.

Party standings

Members

† denotes women who were newly elected in the 2011 election and are serving their first term in office.
†† denotes women who were not members of the 40th Parliament, but previously served in another parliament.

References

41st Canadian Parliament
Parliament, 41